Robin Reid (born 19 February 1971) is a British former professional boxer who competed from 1993 to 2012. He held the WBC super-middleweight title from 1996 to 1997, and the IBO super-middleweight title from 2004 to 2005. As an amateur, Reid 
represented Great Britain at 1992 Summer Olympics, winning a bronze medal in the light-middleweight division.

Amateur career

Highlights
1988 2nd at Light Middleweight at Junior Tournament in Bratislava, Czechoslovakia. Lost to Marco Theuer of Germany in the final
1989 2nd at Light Middleweight at Junior World Championships in Bayamon, Puerto Rico. Lost to Leonides Bedey of Cuba in the final on points.
1990 3rd at Light Middleweight in ABA championships
1991 fought as a Light Middleweight at World Championships in Sydney, Australia. Results were:
Defeated Charmstrong Karnshupan (Thailand) TKO 1
Lost to Israel Akopkokhian (Soviet Union) points
1992 1st place at Canada Cup as a Light Middleweight. Results were:
Defeated Darren Obah (Australia) points
Defeated Ray Downey (Canada) points
Defeated Alexander Pavelets (Ukraine) points
Won the Light Middleweight bronze medal for Great Britain at the 1992 Olympics in Barcelona, Spain. Results were:
Defeated Marcus Thomas (Barbados) KO 1
Defeated Leonidas Maleckis (Lithuania) points
Defeated Ole Klemetsen (Norway) points
Lost to Orhan Delibaş (Netherlands) points
51-16 Amateur record.

Professional career
Reid began his professional career in 1993. In 1996, he captured the World Boxing Council super middleweight title by defeating Vincenzo Nardiello by a TKO in 7.  He then successfully defended his title three times, including a victory over Henry Wharton and Hacine Cherifi.  Reid then lost his title to Thulani Malinga via a unanimous decision.  He then lost decisions to Joe Calzaghe and Silvio Branco.

In 2003 Reid faced IBF and WBA super middleweight title holder Sven Ottke, who took a narrow and highly disputed unanimous decision over Reid. He was keen on a rematch with Calzaghe, but the latter was more interested in pursuing other current and former champions such as Mitchell, Brewer (both of whom he defeated) and Ottke himself (who took only one more fight, then retired without fighting Calzaghe, leaving his titles vacant). In 2005, Reid landed a shot at IBF super middleweight title holder Jeff Lacy, who had taken one of Ottke's vacated titles. A victory would have made a rematch (which would have been both a grudge match and a WBO/IBF unification fight) with Calzaghe almost inevitable, but Lacy dominated him and won via an 8th-round TKO, and it was Lacy who went on to fight Calzaghe and lose a lop-sided 12-round decision.

After the Lacy fight, Reid beat Jessie Brinkley and then suffered a retired hurt defeat  at the hands of Carl Froch in a British super-middleweight fight in November 2007, he announced his decision to retire soon after this fight.
 
In January 2009 Reid said on Liverpool's City Talk radio station that he would like to come out of retirement and fight Tony Dodson for the British super-middleweight title, providing Dodson overcomes Brian Magee on 28 March at the Echo Arena, Liverpool, Merseyside.
“I would love to fight Tony Dodson for the British super-middleweight title at the ECHO Arena, no disrespect to Tony as I think he is a great fighter, but I have never held the Lonsdale Belt and would love the chance to put it around my waist.

“Obviously, I feel like I still have something left to offer the sport and a fight with Tony in Liverpool – two Scousers going at it for the British title – would be the fight that Liverpool fight fans would want to see most.”

Reid competed in the super middleweight prizefighter competition on 23 March 2011, losing in his first fight via unanimous decision to Tobias Webb. He was to fight three more times over the following year, two victories being followed by a fifth-round defeat which sent him back into retirement.

Personal life
Reid is mixed race; he is half black Jamaican.

In 2010, Reid took over a lead role in the controversial movie Killer Bitch from the MMA fighter Alex Reid who had walked out of the film. His latest film role is in 'Mob Handed'.

Reid still retains strong ties to professional boxing, acting as a judge. In September 2016 he joined the Advisory Board of the World Boxing Federation.

Professional boxing record

References

External links

1971 births
Living people
English male boxers
English people of Jamaican descent
Black British sportspeople
Boxers at the 1992 Summer Olympics
Olympic boxers of Great Britain
Olympic bronze medallists for Great Britain
Boxers from Liverpool
Prizefighter contestants
Olympic medalists in boxing
Medalists at the 1992 Summer Olympics
World Boxing Council champions
World super-middleweight boxing champions
International Boxing Organization champions
Light-middleweight boxers